Severe weather terminology is different around the world, varying between regions and countries.  These are articles which explain terminology in various parts of the world.

Severe weather terminology (United States)
Severe weather terminology (Canada)
Severe weather terminology (Japan)
Hong Kong tropical cyclone warning signals